Bludgeon may refer to:

 Club (weapon)
 Bludgeon, a Teenage Mutant Ninja Turtles character
 Bludgeon, a Transformers character
 WP:BLUDGEON, An english Wikipedia term for a type of disruptive editing

See also
 Bludgeoning